Johannes Augustus Botha (1879–1920) was a South African Springbok rugby player, who played as a lock.

Personal

Botha was born to Johan and Johanna (Stegman) Botha on 19 November 1879 in Cape Town, Cape Colony. He was more commonly known as "John". After matriculating at Sea Point High School in Cape Town, Botha became a farmer and married Christina Fourie. He died on 8 December 1920 in Standerton, Transvaal, South Africa caused by a lightning bolt.

Rugby

Botha played rugby for the clubs Hamiltons and Diggers, as well as for his province Transvaal and the Springboks. He made his only International South Africa test appearance on 12 September 1903, at Newlands in Cape Town, Cape Province, South Africa, playing as one of the locks. The game was between the Springboks and Great Britain. The Springboks won 8-0.

References

South African rugby union players
1879 births
1920 deaths
South Africa international rugby union players
Rugby union locks
Alumni of Sea Point High School
Rugby union players from Cape Town
Golden Lions players